Cilindro de Marboré (3,328 m) (also known as Pico Cilindro and Pic du Cylindre) is a mountain in the Monte Perdido massif in the Pyrenees.

It is one of the three mountains comprising Las Tres Sorores (the three sisters), the others being Monte Perdido (3,355 m) and Soum de Ramond (3,263 m).

It is the northernmost point of Spain crossed by the IERS Reference Meridian.

See also
List of Pyrenean three-thousanders

External links
Cilindro de Marboré on SummitPost

Mountains of Aragon
Mountains of the Pyrenees
Pyrenean three-thousanders